Antônio Frederico de Castro Alves (14 March 1847 – 6 July 1871) was a Brazilian poet and playwright, famous for his abolitionist and republican poems. One of the most famous poets of the "Condorism", he won the epithet of "O Poeta dos Escravos" ("The Poet of the Slaves").

He is the patron of the 7th chair of the Brazilian Academy of Letters.

Life

Castro Alves was born in the town of Curralinho (renamed "Castro Alves" in his honor in 1900), in the Brazilian state of Bahia, to Antônio José Alves, a doctor, and Clélia Brasília da Silva Castro, one of the daughters of José Antônio da Silva Castro (a.k.a. "Periquitão", Portuguese for "Big Parakeet"), a prominent fighter in the 1821–23 Siege of Salvador. In 1853, he was sent to study in the Colégio Sebrão, run by Abílio César Borges, the Baron of Macaúbas. There, he met and befriended Ruy Barbosa.

In 1862, he moved to Recife to study at the Faculdade de Direito do Recife, but he was rejected twice. He was not able to join the college until 1864, there meeting Tobias Barreto and José Bonifácio the Younger (step-grandson of the statesman José Bonifácio). They heavily influenced Alves' writing style, and he, in turn, influenced them both. His father died in 1866 and shortly after, he met the Portuguese actress Eugênia Câmara, and started dating her.

In 1867, Alves returned to Bahia with Câmara and wrote his drama Gonzaga, ou A Revolução de Minas, based on the life of the Luso-Brazilian Neoclassic poet Tomás António Gonzaga and his participation in the failed 1789 Minas Conspiracy. In the following year, he and Câmara went to São Paulo, where he entered the Faculdade de Direito da Universidade de São Paulo and once more met Ruy Barbosa. There he also befriended Pedro Luís Pereira de Sousa and wrote a poem named "Deusa incruenta", based on Sousa's work "Terribilis Dea". His play Gonzaga was performed at the end of 1868. It was well received by critics and public alike, but Alves was sad because his romantic engagement with Eugênia Câmara had terminated.

During a hunting trip in the same year, Alves received an accidental shotgun wound in his left foot, which had to be amputated due to the risk of gangrene. However, a prosthesis was made for him, and thus he was able to walk again (although with the use of an assistive cane). He spent 1870 in his home-state of Bahia, trying to recover from the tuberculosis he got while in São Paulo. Also in 1870, Alves published the poetry book Espumas Flutuantes – the only work he published during his lifetime. All his other works were published posthumously.

Alves' attempts to mitigate the tuberculosis were in vain; he died on 6 July 1871, in the city of Salvador, at 24.

Works
 Espumas Flutuantes (1870)
 Gonzaga, ou A Revolução de Minas (1875)
 A Cachoeira de Paulo Afonso (1876)
 Vozes d'África (1880)
 O Navio Negreiro (1880)
 Os Escravos (1883)

Alves also translated into Portuguese many poems by Victor Hugo, and Lord Byron's "Darkness" and "Lines Inscribed Upon a Cup Formed from a Skull". They can be found on Espumas Flutuantes.

Legacy
 The Castro Alves Masonic Lodge was founded in 1952 in São Paulo.
 The Castro Alves Theater in Salvador was opened in 1967. The theater was designed by José Bina Fonyat Filho and Humberto Lemos Lopes, and is located in the city's Campo Grande district.
 A B'nai B'rith lodge was named after the poet. The Castro Alves lodge was founded in 1961 and located in São Salvador, Bahia.

Representations in popular culture
Alves was portrayed by Paulo Maurício in the 1949 film Vendaval Maravilhoso, loosely based on Jorge Amado's 1941 book The ABC of Castro Alves, and by Bruno Garcia in Silvio Tendler's 1999 documentary Castro Alves: Retrato Falado do Poeta.

References

External links

 Castro Alves' biography at the official site of the Brazilian Academy of Letters 
 
 

1847 births
1871 deaths
19th-century Brazilian dramatists and playwrights
19th-century Brazilian poets
19th-century Brazilian male writers
19th-century deaths from tuberculosis
Brazilian abolitionists
Brazilian amputees
Brazilian male dramatists and playwrights
Brazilian people of Portuguese descent
Brazilian male poets
Patrons of the Brazilian Academy of Letters
People from Salvador, Bahia
Romantic poets
Tuberculosis deaths in Bahia
University of São Paulo alumni